Nord éclair is a French language regional newspaper in Roubaix, France, that has been in circulation since 1944.

History and profile
Nord éclair was first published on 5 September 1944. The paper has its headquarters in Roubaix and is published in tabloid format. It was part of the Hersant group and is published in Pilaterie, Lille, by the La Voix du Nord group.

The Belgian edition of Nord éclair has been in circulation since 1968. The paper was owned by the  Socpresse SA, a subsidiary of the Hersant group. It is now part of the Belgian company Rossel. In addition Nord éclair has five editions in its circulation area.

In 1990 Nord éclair sold 99,300 copies. The paper had a circulation of 110,000 copies in 2001.

See also
 List of newspapers in France

References

External links
 Official website

1944 establishments in France
Mass media in Lille
French-language newspapers
Publications established in 1944